Marquess Gaeseong (d. 1062), personal name Wang Gae was a Korean Royal Prince as the third and youngest son of Jeongjong of Goryeo and Queen Yongui. Due to his father's death when he was young, so he was raised and brought up into the Palace by his half-uncle, Munjong of Goryeo.

In 1052, he became the preceptor in Dongsam Temple, Gaebu and appointed as Sangseoryeong (상서령) to work in Sangju State with his new title as Marquess Gaeseong (개성후, 開城侯). At the same time, he also received 2.000 sik-eup (식읍). Then became Jainborijwahwagongsin (자인보리좌화공신, 資仁保理佐化功臣). He later died in 1062 and received his Posthumous name Sinsang (신상, 愼殤).

References

Korean princes
Year of birth unknown
1062 deaths
Date of birth unknown
10th-century Korean people